A list of active and extinct volcanoes in the Federation of Saint Kitts and Nevis, located in the Caribbean.

The two islands of Saint Kitts and Nevis are located in the Leeward Islands chain of the Lesser Antilles archipelago.

List

See also

Lists of volcanoes

References

 
Saint Kitts and Nevis
Volcanoes
 
Saint Kitts